Mimopolyocha is a monotypic snout moth genus described by Shōnen Matsumura in 1925. Its only species, Mimopolyocha obscurella, had been described by the same author in 1911. It is found in Russia.

References

Moths described in 1911
Phycitinae
Taxa named by Shōnen Matsumura
Monotypic moth genera
Moths of Asia